The Democratic Group of the Centre (GDC) was a political alliance in Romania. Its members were the Socialist-Liberal Party, the Cluj Democratic Party, and the Democratic Romanian Front 16-20.XII.1989 Timișoara. The alliance broke up after the 1990 general elections. The Socialist-Liberal Party (PSL) merged with PNL later that year. However, the former PSL leadership left PNL in 1992 to create PNL-CD.

History
The GDC contested the 1990 general elections, receiving around 0.5% of the vote in both the Chamber and Senate elections. Although it failed to win a seat in the Senate, the party won two seats in the Chamber.

Electoral history

Legislative elections

References

Defunct political parties in Romania